Damien Faulkner (born 15 February 1977) is an Irish race car driver from Moville  County Donegal.  Beginning his professional career in Formula Vauxhall Junior in 1995, he competed in the Formula Ford Festival in 1996 and finished 11th.  He finished in 3rd place in Vauxhall Junior in 1997 and moved to Formula Palmer Audi in 1998 where he finished sixth and third in series points in his first two seasons. At the end of 1999 he had his first taste of F3000 when he tested for Arden as part of his prize for finishing third in Palmer Audi.

In 2000 Faulkner dominated the new European Formula Palmer Audi series taking 6 wins on his way to the title. His prize for winning the series assisted him in finding a seat in the American Champ Car feeder series Indy Lights for 2001. In the series' final season he drove for Dorricott Racing, capturing 2 wins on his way to third place in series points. A return home to Mondello Park during the season also saw him win his class in a one-off FIA Sportscar Championship race.

Faulkner returned to Europe in 2002 and competed in a partial season in the Formula Nissan World Series.  With nothing on the horizon for 2003 Faulkner's career was rescued by a dominant performance as a guest driver in the BTCC supporting Porsche Carrera Cup GB, again at his home circuit, Mondello Park. This drive led to a Porsche Supercup guest appearance and an invite to again compete at Mondello in 2004. A further strong drive secured a seat for the remainder of the season with Team SAS and Faulkner went on to take the team's first race win before the season's end. Two more years with the team brought two championship victories and a graduation in 2007 to the Porsche Supercup.

A successful debut Supercup season yielded two wins and second in the championship with the title fight going right down to the final race of the season. 2007's performances have put Faulkner firmly back on the map as he heads into a second season in the Supercup with Walter Lechner Racing and has also received invites to two of the biggest pre-season events on the calendar, the Dubai 24hrs and 24 Hours of Daytona.

He drove the Formula One medical car at the 2002 Malaysian Grand Prix and the safety car at the 2002 United States Grand Prix.

Racing record

Complete Porsche Supercup results
(key) (Races in bold indicate pole position – 2 points awarded 2008 onwards in all races) (Races in italics indicate fastest lap)

† — Did not finish the race, but was classified as he completed over 90% of the race distance.

‡ — Guest driver – Not eligible for points.

References

External links
Damien Faulkner official website

1977 births
Irish racing drivers
Sportspeople from County Donegal
Indy Lights drivers
Living people
Formula Palmer Audi drivers
American Le Mans Series drivers
24 Hours of Daytona drivers
Rolex Sports Car Series drivers
Porsche Supercup drivers
WeatherTech SportsCar Championship drivers
Porsche Carrera Cup GB drivers
24H Series drivers
Walter Lechner Racing drivers
Murphy Prototypes drivers
European Le Mans Series drivers
Michelin Pilot Challenge drivers